Gilles Panizzi (born 19 September 1965) is a former French rally driver.

Panizzi was born in Roquebrune-Cap-Martin, Alpes-Maritimes. Like many of his fellow rally racing countrymen, Panizzi spent a great deal of his developmental driving years participating in asphalt rally events throughout his native land.

In 1996 and 1997, Panizzi won the French Championship title in a Peugeot-backed (funded) 306 kit car. It was at that point that he was nominated to drive for Peugeot as their resident asphalt (tarmac/sealed-surface) expert.

Between 1999 and 2003 Panizzi had great success in his role as Peugeot's tarmac expert. He won a total of seven World Rally Championship rounds in this period - all on tarmac. However, Panizzi's inability to match his rivals pace on gravel, mud, and snow precluded him from challenging for the world title while at Peugeot. Panizzi had an embarrassing moment during the 2000 Safari Rally, where he and his brother and co-driver Herve were behind the slower car of Argentine driver Roberto Sanchez, who had not moved over despite being ordered to do so was kicking up dust and blinding the irate Panizzi, who picked up two punctures thanks to the stones thrown up by Sanchez's car. The Panizzi brothers were so furious that after the end of the stage they both ran up to Sanchez's car, opened the door and started physically assaulting the Argentine driver, both trying to pull Sanchez out of his car. The Panizzi brothers actions landed them both a $50,000 fine.
He is the only WRC driver to do a (famous) 360 spin at the Viladrau hairpin, which he did at the 2002 Rally Catalunya.

In 2004, Mitsubishi Motor Sports recruited Panizzi and his co-driver and brother, Hervé, to lead the company's charge back in the World Rally Championship.

In the 2005 season, Panizzi was replaced in the lead car by Harri Rovanperä, and guested in the second car with Gianluigi Galli. He finished third at the Monte Carlo Rally, the first event of the season, but only scored points in one other event.

In 2006, he was signed by the semi-privateer Red Bull Škoda team. Despite a strong performance in the opening rally of the season in Monte Carlo, he expressed his dissatisfaction at the performance of his car, and after a disappointing showing in Spain, he announced his departure from the team, and was replaced by his former Peugeot teammate Harri Rovanperä.

Panizzi later participated in 2 Intercontinental Rally Challenge events - the 2007 Rallye Sanremo with the Peugeot 207 S2000 and 2010 Rallye Sanremo with Proton Satria Neo S2000, finishing respectively 8th and 22nd.

The 2021 Rallye Mont-Blanc Morzine saw Panizzi's one-off rallying return. He used a Hyundai i20 R5, finishing 15th overall.

WRC victories 

{|class="wikitable"
!   #  
! Event
! Season
! Co-driver
! Car
|-
| 1
|  44ème V-Rally Tour de Corse - Rallye de France
| 2000
| Hervé Panizzi
| Peugeot 206 WRC
|-
| 2
|  42º Rallye Sanremo - Rallye d'Italia
| 2000
| Hervé Panizzi
| Peugeot 206 WRC
|-
| 3
|  43º Rallye Sanremo - Rallye d'Italia
| 2001
| Hervé Panizzi
| Peugeot 206 WRC
|-
| 4
|  46ème Rallye de France - Tour de Corse
| 2002
| Hervé Panizzi
| Peugeot 206 WRC
|-
| 5
|  38º Rallye Catalunya-Costa Brava (Rallye de España)
| 2002
| Hervé Panizzi
| Peugeot 206 WRC
|-
| 6
|  44º Rallye Sanremo - Rallye d'Italia
| 2002
| Hervé Panizzi
| Peugeot 206 WRC
|-
| 7
|  39º Rallye Catalunya-Costa Brava (Rallye de España)
| 2003
| Hervé Panizzi
| Peugeot 206 WRC
|}

Complete WRC results

References

Sources 
 WRC.com - the official World Rally Championship website.
 Official Website - note: inactive as of April 2006

1965 births
Living people
People from Roquebrune-Cap-Martin
French people of Italian descent
French rally drivers
World Rally Championship drivers
Sportspeople from Alpes-Maritimes
Peugeot Sport drivers
Škoda Motorsport drivers